The Taylorcraft L-2 Grasshopper is an American observation and liaison aircraft built by Taylorcraft for the United States Army Air Forces in World War II.

Design and development
In 1941 the United States Army Air Forces ordered four Taylorcraft Ds with the designation YO-57. They were evaluated in the summer of 1941 during maneuvers in Louisiana and Texas where they were used for support purposes such as light transport and courier. General Innis P. Swift, commander of the 1st Cavalry Division, coined the 'grasshopper' name after witnessing a bumpy landing. This led to a production order under the designation O-57 Grasshopper. In March 1942, the designation was changed to L-2 Grasshopper.

In World War II, the AAF began using the L-2 in much the same manner as the observation balloon was used in France during World War I—spotting enemy troop and supply concentrations and directing artillery fire on them. It was also used for other types of liaison and transport duties and short-range reconnaissance which required airplanes that could land and take off in minimal distances from unprepared landing strips.

Postwar, several L-2s were converted for civilian use and are operated by private pilot owners in the United States as the Model DCO-65. Several are still airworthy in 2021.

The L-2 series meet the standards for light-sport aircraft (other than the L-2M, which has a gross weight rating five pounds over the 1,320-lb limit), thus can be flown by pilots holding the Sport Pilot Certificate.

Variants
YO-57
Military version of the Taylorcraft Model D, four for evaluation with a 65hp YO-170-3 and tandem seating, later became O-57 then L-2.
O-57
Production version with minor changes and a 65hp O-170-3 engine and tandem seating, 20 built, re-designated L-2 in 1942.
O-57A
O-57 with modified cabin and military radios and an observers seat that could face backwards, 336 built, re-designated L-2A
L-2
O-57 re-designated in 1942, a further 50 built.
L-2A
O-57A re-designated in 1942, a further 140 built.
L-2B
L-2A with modifications for artillery spotting with a 65hp Continental A65-8 engine and tandem seating, 490 built.
L-2C
13 Taylorcraft Model DC65 with tandem seating, impressed into Army service.
L-2D
One Taylorcraft Model DL65 with tandem seating, impressed into Army service.
L-2E
Two impressed Taylorcaft Model DF65s with a 65hp Franklin 4AC-176-B2 and tandem seating into Army service.
L-2F
Seven impressed Taylorcraft Model BL65s with side-by-side seating and a 65hp O-145-B1 engine, one originally designated UC-95.
L-2G
Two impressed Taylorcraft Model BFs with side-by-side seating and a 50hp Franklin 4AC-150-50 engine.
L-2H
Nine impressed Taylorcraft Model BC12-65s with side-by-side seating and a 65hp Continental A65-7 engine.
L-2J
Five impressed Taylorcraft Model BL12-65s with side-by-side seating and a 65hp O-145-B1 engine.
L-2K
Four impressed Taylorcraft Model BF12-65s with side-by-side seating and a 65hp Franklin 4AC-176-B2 engine.
L-2L
Single impressed Taylorcraft Model BF60 with side-by-side seating and a 60hp Franklin 4AC-171 engine.
L-2M
L-2A with close-fitting engine cowls and wing spoilers and tandem seating, 900 built.
TG-6
Model ST.100 three-seat training glider variant with enlarged fin area, wing spoilers and a simpler landing gear, 250 built.
LNT-1
U.S. Navy version of TG-6
XLNT-2
Modified LNT-1 for Glomb trials.
UC-95
One impressed Taylorcraft Model BL65s with side-by-side seating and a 65hp O-145-B1 engine, re-designated L-2F.

Operators

French Navy

Haiti Air Corps

Royal Netherlands East Indies Army Air Force - Postwar

United States Army Air Forces

Airworthy Aircraft
 43-25823 - L2M operated by the Commemorative Air Force.
 43-26050 - L-2M operated by the Texas Air Museum in Slaton, Texas.

Aircraft on display
 43-26110 – L-2M on static display at the Pima Air & Space Museum in Tucson, Arizona.
 43-26433 – L-2M on static display at the Aerospace Museum of California in McClellan, California.
 43-26592 – L-2M on static display at the National Museum of the United States Air Force in Dayton, Ohio.

Specifications (Taylorcraft L-2A)

See also

References

Citations

Bibliography

External links

L-2 page at the National Museum of the United States Air Force
L-2 page at Warbird Alley
www.als-cannonfield.com - operates restored L-2s

Taylorcraft L-2
World War II reconnaissance aircraft of the United States
L-2
Single-engined tractor aircraft
Aircraft first flown in 1941